Central Film School (CFS) (formerly Central Film School London) is a private film school in South West London, based in Landor Road, Clapham, London. It was founded in 2008.

History 
Founded in 2008, Central Film School has provided students from all over the world with the tools needed to become professionals in the film industry.
Since 2013, the school has offered undergraduate degrees in Practical Filmmaking and Screenwriting, as well as short courses and postgraduate degrees. As a micro provider of Higher Education, the school hosts around 100 students each year.

In 2015, CFS entered into partnership with Bertha Foundation, a philanthropic organisation that funds documentary features. The school offers documentary modules and factual specialisms to reflect this partnership.

Faculty 
The school moved to their new home in Clapham in 2022. The impressive Edwardian building features two multi purpose studios, three classrooms, edit rooms, a fully equipped post production suite, a library, props, kit and paint rooms and a student social space.

Industry Talks 
In the past years, CFS hosted student Q&As with  filmmakers such as Nick Hornby, George Amponsah (director of The Hard Stop), and Sir Ronald Harwood.

Alumni 
Alumni include BAFTA Cymru award-winning director Kim Strobl, Bollywood director Zaid Ali Khan, Tamil actor Naga, and Nigerian actor Demola Adedoyin.

References

External links
Official website

Film schools in England